The Little Town Will Go to Sleep is a 1954 West German comedy film directed by Hans H. König and starring Gustav Fröhlich, Jester Naefe and Helen Vita. It shares its title with a popular song of the era. It was shot at the Wiesbaden Studios in Hesse and partly on location at Limburg an der Lahn. The film's sets were designed by the art director Hans Sohnle.

Main cast
 Gustav Fröhlich as Peter Bruck - Bildhauer
 Jester Naefe as Ingrid Altmann
 Helen Vita as Fräulein Lissy - eine 'Dame'
 Herbert Hübner as Friedrich Altmann - Regierungsbaurat
 Gert Fröbe as Oskar Blume - Gelegenheitsarbeiter
 Harald Paulsen as Fritz Waldvogel - Rechtsberater
 Hermann Pfeiffer as Manfred Schmidt - Konfektionär
 Alexander Golling as Bürgermeister
 Gerda Maurus as Charlotte Altmann
 Margit Symo as Rita Heinrich - Kosmetikerin
 Ingeborg Morawski as Fräulein von Dobereck
 Gusti Kreissl as Frau des Bürgermeisters
 Bobby Todd as Prof. Borgius - Philosph
 Hans Hermann Schaufuß as Postbeamter

References

Bibliography 
 Hans-Michael Bock and Tim Bergfelder. The Concise Cinegraph: An Encyclopedia of German Cinema. Berghahn Books, 2009.

External links 
 

1954 films
1954 comedy films
German comedy films
West German films
1950s German-language films
Films directed by Hans H. König
German black-and-white films
1950s German films